Google IME, also known as Google Input Tools, is a set of input method editors by Google for 22 languages, including Amharic, Arabic, Bengali, Chinese, Greek, Gujarati, Hindi, Japanese, Kannada, Malayalam, Marathi, Nepali, Persian, Punjabi, Russian, Sanskrit, Serbian, Tamil, Telugu, Tigrinya, and Urdu. It is a virtual keyboard that allows users to type in their local language text directly in any application without the hassle of copying and pasting.

Available as a Chrome extension, it was also available as a desktop application for Microsoft Windows until it was removed in May 2018.

Google Transliteration IME 
Google's service for Indic languages was previously available as an online text editor, named Google Indic Transliteration. Other language transliteration capabilities were added (beyond just Indic languages) and it was renamed simply Google transliteration. Later on, because of its steady rise in popularity, it was released as Google Transliteration IME for offline use in December 2009. 

It works on a dictionary-based phonetic transliteration approach, which means that whatever you type in Latin characters, it matches the characters with its dictionary and transliterates them. It also gives suggestions for matching words.

See also 
 Google Pinyin
 Google Japanese Input
 Google transliteration
 Microsoft Indic Language Input Tool
 Azhagi (software)

References

External links 
Google IME
Google Pinyin IME
Google Japanese IME
Google Input Tools for Windows
Google Cloud Input Tools online

IME
Input method editor
Indic computing
Urdu-language computing
Windows text-related software
MacOS text-related software
Linux text-related software
Han pinyin input